The Japanese Formula 3 Championship was the 40th Japanese Formula 3 Championship season.

Teams and drivers

Race calendar
Calendar for the 2018 season. All races are scheduled to be held in Japan.  

Race 9 at Okayama International Circuit was postponed due to severe weather conditions.  The race was rescheduled for a later round at the same circuit, and was subsequently postponed again to be run at Sportsland SUGO.

Championship standings
Points are awarded as follows:

Drivers' Championships

Overall

National Class

References

External links
  

Japanese Formula 3 Championship seasons
Formula Three
Japanese Formula 3
Japanese F3